Treasure Quest is a one-hour weekly American reality television series that premiered on January 15, 2009 on the Discovery Channel. The program follows the employees of Odyssey Marine Exploration 
as they search the English Channel for various lost ships.  The team is led by company CEO Gregory Stemm and Tom Dettweiler (operations director of Robert Ballard's team that discovered the RMS Titanic).

Notable shipwrecks discovered
Nuestra Señora de las Mercedes (Our Lady of Mercy in English) - Spanish frigate which was sunk by the British off the south coast of Portugal on 5 October 1804 during the Battle of Cape Santa Maria.  The TV episode was produced believing the wreck to be the Merchant Royal, but later investigation now points to it being the Nuestra Señora de las Mercedes.  The recovered treasure had to be returned to Spain after a U.S. Supreme Court ruling.
Marqise de Tornay - A French privateer.
HMS Victory - A first-rate ship of the line of the British Royal Navy.
RMS Laconia - An ocean liner transformed into an armed merchant cruiser during World War I, sunk by a German U-boat. Also known as the Silver Queen due to the precious metals on board when sunk.
 - A German U-boat in WWI, sunk by the

See also
Treasure Quest: Snake Island
Black Swan Project
Merchant Royal

References

External links 
 

Discovery Channel original programming
2009 American television series debuts
2009 American television series endings
2000s American reality television series